Maheshtala Assembly constituency is a Legislative Assembly constituency of South 24 Parganas district in the Indian State of West Bengal.

Overview
As per order of the Delimitation Commission in respect of the Delimitation of constituencies in the West Bengal, Maheshtala Assembly constituency is composed of the following:
 Ward No. 8 and Ward No. 11 to Ward No. 35 of Maheshtala Municipality

Maheshtala Assembly constituency is a part of No. 21 Diamond Harbour (Lok Sabha constituency).

Members of Legislative Assembly

Election Results

Legislative Assembly Election 2021

By-Election 2018

Legislative Assembly Election 2016

Legislative Assembly Election 2011

Legislative Assembly Elections 1977-2006
In 2006, 2001 and 1996, Mursalin Molla of CPI(M) won the Maheshtala Assembly constituency defeating his nearest rivals Dulal Das of INC in 2006, Biman Banerjee of AITC in 2001 and Gouranga Mukherjee of INC in 1996. Abul Basar of CPI(M) defeated Malay Chowdhury of INC in 1991 and Habibur Rahman of INC in 1987. Mir Abdus Sayeed of CPI(M) defeated Dilip Ghose, Independent politician, in 1982. Sudhir Chandra Bhandari of CPI(M) defeated Mali Safiuddin of Janata Party in 1977.

Legislative Assembly Elections 1952-1972
Bhupen Bijali of INC won in 1972. Sudhir Chandra Bhandari of CPI(M) won in 1971, 1969 and 1967. Ahammad Ali Mufti of INC won in 1962. Sudhir Chandra Bhandari of CPI won in 1957 and 1952.

References

Notes

Citations

Assembly constituencies of West Bengal
Politics of South 24 Parganas district